Indiana Avenue Historic District may refer to:

Indiana Avenue Historic District (Indianapolis, Indiana), listed on the National Register of Historic Places in Indianapolis, Indiana
Indiana Avenue Historic District in Maryville, Tennessee, included in the College Hill Historic District (Maryville, Tennessee)